Ernesto Murro (born 1951) is a Uruguayan politician.

He is of the Broad Front, he serves as Ministry of Labour and Social Welfare in the government of Tabaré Vázquez.

References 

1951 births
Broad Front (Uruguay) politicians
Ministers of Labor and Social Affairs of Uruguay
Living people
Date of birth missing (living people)